Cindy Lynne Frich (born March 19, 1960) is an American politician who previously served as a Republican member of the West Virginia House of Delegates.

Personal life and education
Frich was born on March 19, 1960, in Pittsburgh, Pennsylvania, to John and Marlene Frich. She earned a bachelor’s degree in political science from Miami University in Oxford, Ohio and completed postgraduate studies at West Virginia University, however, did not obtain a degree.

Electoral history

1990s

1998
Initially in District 44, Frich placed in the 1998 Republican Primary but lost the eight-way four-position November 3, 1998 General election.

2000s

2000
Frich placed again in the 2000 Republican Primary, but lost the seven-way four-position November 7, 2000 General election.

2002
With incumbent Republican Representative Sheirl Fletcher leaving the Legislature and leaving a seat open, Frich ran in the 2002 Republican Primary and won the seat in the November 5, 2002 General election.

2004
Frich placed in the five-way 2004 Republican Primary, and was re-elected in the November 2, 2004 General election.

2006
Frich placed in the five-way 2006 Republican Primary, but lost the eight-way four-position November 7, 2006 General election, with Alex Shook winning Frich’s seat.

2008
Frich ran in the May 13, 2008 Republican Primary, placing first with 3,110 votes (62.8%), but placed fifth in the six-way four-position November 4, 2008 General election.

2010s

2010
When Senate District 13 Democratic Senator Mike Oliverio retired and left the seat open, Frich ran unopposed in the May 11, 2010 Republican Primary, winning with 3,921 votes but lost the November 2, 2010 General election to Democratic Representative Robert Beach.

2012
Redistricted to District 51 alongside all four District 44 incumbents, Frich ran in the seven-way May 8, 2012 Republican Primary and placed first with 2,969 votes (21.9%) and placed second in the eleven-way five-position November 6, 2012 General election with 14,677 votes (11.7%).

2018
With five seats open in the 2018 General election, which was held on November 6, 2018, Frich placed seventh in a twelve-way election with 12,601 votes, 1,639 short of the final seat, losing to Barbara Fleischauer (D), John Williams (D), Rodney Pyles (D), Evan Hansen (D) and newcomer Danielle Walker (D).

2020
With five seats open in the 2020 General election, which was held on November 3, 2020, Frich placed sixth.

References

External links
Campaign site

Cindy Frich at Ballotpedia
Cindy Frich at OpenSecrets

1960 births
Living people
Republican Party members of the West Virginia House of Delegates
Politicians from Morgantown, West Virginia
Politicians from Pittsburgh
West Virginia University alumni
Women state legislators in West Virginia
21st-century American politicians
21st-century American women politicians